Freedom Communications, Inc., was an American media conglomerate that operated daily and weekly newspapers, websites and mobile applications, as well as Coast Magazine and other specialty publications. Headquartered at 625 N. Grand Avenue in Santa Ana, California, it was owned by a private equity firm, 2100 Trust, established in 2010 by investor Aaron Kushner  Freedom's flagship newspaper was the Orange County Register, based in Santa Ana.

Ownership
Founder R.C. Hoiles gained a one-third interest in his first newspaper (The Alliance Review in Ohio) sometime in the 1910s. He and his brother Frank bought many more local newspapers over the next several decades.  In 1935 he moved his base of operations to Santa Ana, California, and in 1950 he incorporated his syndicate as Freedom Newspapers, Inc. It was renamed Freedom Communications in 1993. Freedom was operated as an entirely family-owned business until 2004, when private-equity firms Blackstone Group and Providence Equity Partners acquired a 40 percent share in Freedom for about $460 million. As part of this transaction, Freedom had acquired substantial debt.

On September 1, 2009, Freedom Communications went into a Chapter 11 bankruptcy reorganization. The company left bankruptcy on April 30, 2010, under the ownership of investment firms Alden Global Capital, Angelo, Gordon & Co. and Luxor Capital Group. Lenders to the company also retained a stake in Freedom.

The company announced on November 2, 2011 that it would sell its entire television division to Sinclair Broadcast Group in a move to eliminate the company's debt. The sale was completed on April 2, 2012.

Freedom began selling the majority of its newspaper portfolio in 2012. Four papers in the Midwest were sold to Ohio Community Media, an affiliate of the private equity firm Versa Capital Management, in May. The Clovis News Journal and other newspapers in New Mexico were sold to Stevenson Newspapers. Freedom papers in Texas were sold to AIM Media Texas. Its Florida and North Carolina papers were sold to Halifax Media Group.

On June 11, 2012, Freedom Communications Holdings, Inc., announced an agreement to be acquired by 2100 Trust, LLC. in a merger with a subsidiary of 2100 Trust. On July 25, 2012, the latter, led by entrepreneur Aaron Kushner, acquired Freedom's dailies, associated non-daily publications and digital properties. The company continued to operate under the name Freedom Communications.

Kushner, who "preached the virtues of local journalism and a print product,"  bought Freedom in 2012 for $50 million plus assumption of pension liabilities. He increased staff and added new sections at the Orange County Register and began a new daily, the Long Beach Register. In January 2014, however, he announced heavy layoffs in Orange County and at the Riverside Press-Enterprise, which he also owned.  The Register launched a Los Angeles edition, the Los Angeles Register, on April 16, 2014, but the venture ended five months later.  The Long Beach Register became a Sunday-only publication in June 2014, and ceased publication in December 2014.

Freedom closed the sale of The Gazette (Colorado Springs) to Clarity Media, a subsidiary of The Anschutz Corporation, on November 30, 2012. In 2013, Freedom Communications sold the Yuma Sun and the Porterville Recorder to Rhode Island Suburban Newspapers and the Appeal-Democrat to Horizon Publications. In 2014, Freedom sold the Daily Press and the Desert Dispatch to New Media Investment Group.

On November 1, 2015, Freedom Communications filed for Chapter 11 bankruptcy protection.

In January, Freedom closed several of its weekly papers in Orange County. On March 21, 2016 a bankruptcy judge approved the sale of Freedom Communications and its two major newspapers, the Orange County Register and the Riverside Press-Enterprise to Digital First Media (DFM). DFM is the parent of the Los Angeles News Group (LANG), which was renamed the Southern California News Group on the same day, and which owns eleven daily newspapers in Southern California.

Leadership
Founder and chief executive officer R.C. Hoiles led Freedom until his death in 1970. He was succeeded as chief executive officer by his son, C.H. Hoiles, who served until 1981, and then by:
 D.R. Segal (1981–1992)
 James N. Rosse (1992–1999)
 Samuel C. Wolgemuth (1999–2002)
 Alan Bell (2002–2006)
 Scott N. Flanders (2006–2009)
 Burl Osborne (2009–2010)
 Mitchell Stern (2010–2012)
 Aaron Kushner (2012–2015)
 Rich Mirman (2015−2016)

Newspapers

Freedom's newspaper portfolio consists of:

Los Angeles County
 Weekly newspapers:
 Easy Reader  of Hermosa Beach (managed by Freedom pursuant to long-term agreement); includes 3 Easy Reader magazines:
Beach
Peninsula People
Drop Zone

Riverside County
 The Press-Enterprise of Riverside
 Weekly newspaper:
 Desert Enterprise of Palm Springs

Regional
 Unidos en el Sur de California (regional Spanish-language weekly)

Orange County
 The Orange County Register of Santa Ana
 Weekly newspapers:
 Anaheim Hills News of Anaheim Hills
 Anaheim Bulletin of Anaheim
 Capistrano Valley News of San Juan Capistrano
 The Current of Newport Beach
 Dana Point News of Dana Point
 Fountain Valley View of Fountain Valley
 Fullerton News Tribune of Fullerton
 Huntington Beach Wave of Huntington Beach
 Irvine World News of Irvine
 La Habra/Brea Star Progress of La Habra
 Ladera Post of Ladera Ranch
 Laguna News-Post of Laguna Beach
 Laguna Niguel/Aliso Viejo News of Laguna Niguel
 Laguna Woods Globe of Laguna Woods
 Orange City News of Orange
 Placentia News-Times of Placentia
 Rancho Canyon News of Rancho Santa Margarita
 Saddleback Valley News of Lake Forest
 Saddleback Valley News of Mission Viejo
 Sun Post News of San Clemente
 Tustin News of Tustin
 Yorba Linda Star of Yorba Linda

Former television stations 
Freedom folded its broadcast division in 2012; as a result, none of these stations are currently owned by the company:

Notes:
 1 Freedom's flagship station
 2 Freedom's first television property

References

External links
 

 
Defunct mass media companies of the United States
Defunct newspaper companies of the United States
Defunct broadcasting companies of the United States
Defunct companies based in Greater Los Angeles
Digital First Media
Sinclair Broadcast Group
Companies based in Santa Ana, California
Publishing companies established in 1950
Mass media companies disestablished in 2016
1950 establishments in California
2016 disestablishments in California
Companies that filed for Chapter 11 bankruptcy in 2009
Companies that filed for Chapter 11 bankruptcy in 2015